Tama Fasavalu is a Samoan former international footballer who played in New Zealand for Central United as a defender. On May 3, 2012, Fasavalu was indefinitely suspended from the sport by the Auckland Football Federation after striking a referee and breaking his jaw during a match.

Career

Club career
Fasavalu began his career in Samoa with Kiwi and Tuanaimoto Breeze, before moving to Central United in 2005. He subsequently moved to New Zealand second division Manukau City.

On 25 April 2012 while playing for Manukau City in a match against Tauranga City, Fasavalu was issued a second yellow card at the 79th minute, and subsequently struck referee Len Gattsche in the jaw, breaking it in three places and requiring surgery. Subsequently, Fasavalu was banned from the sport, fined, and criminally charged with wounding with intent to injure.

International career
Fasavalu has played at international level for Samoa.

Career statistics

International goals

References

External links

Living people
Samoan footballers
Samoa international footballers
Samoan expatriate footballers
1976 births
Expatriate association footballers in New Zealand
Samoan expatriate sportspeople in New Zealand
Association football forwards
Association football defenders